is a Japanese footballer who is currently playing for FC Tiamo Hirakata.

Career statistics
Updated to 23 February 2020.

1Includes Promotion Playoffs to J1.

Team honors

Kashima Antlers
 J1 League (2): 2007, 2008

References

External links

Profile at Giravanz Kitakyushu

1985 births
Living people
Kanagawa University alumni
Association football people from Ibaraki Prefecture
Japanese footballers
J1 League players
J2 League players
Japan Football League players
Kashima Antlers players
Cerezo Osaka players
Shonan Bellmare players
Oita Trinita players
Tokyo Verdy players
V-Varen Nagasaki players
Giravanz Kitakyushu players
FC Maruyasu Okazaki players
FC Tiamo Hirakata players
Association football defenders